Ryan Fournier (born December 8, 1995) is an American conservative activist and political commentator best known as the co-founder and acting national chairman of the American youth group Students for Trump.

Early life and education
Fournier was born in Long Branch, New Jersey, on December 8, 1995, and spent his formative years in Clayton, North Carolina.

Career
Fournier became politically active following his volunteer work for the Mitt Romney 2012 presidential campaign. Prior to launching Students for Trump, Fournier was involved in various local and state political campaigns within North Carolina. Along with being the co-chairman of Students for Trump, Fournier also serves as the President of OpenPoll and xStrategies.

In July 2018, Fournier launched a boycott against Walmart for selling shirts labeled "Impeach 45," which resulted in the hashtag #BoycottWalmart trending on Twitter. Walmart pulled the items from its online store, issuing the following statement: "These items were sold by third-party sellers on our open marketplace, and were not offered directly by Walmart. We're removing these types of items pending review of our marketplace policies."

Students for Trump
In 2015, Fournier and John Lambert launched Students for Trump as a Twitter account while they were studying at Campbell University in Buies Creek, NC. Within a year, the group had nearly 300 campus chapters and a considerable social media following.

Controversy
In a since-deleted Facebook post on June 11, 2020, Fournier claimed that donations to Black Lives Matter were being funneled to Democratic campaigns through ActBlue, a Democratic Super PAC. Similar allegations were made by other conservative commentators, such as Candace Owens and the Hodgetwins. The Associated Press and fact-checking website PolitiFact rated the claim to be false.

In a tweet dated January 31, 2021, Fournier claimed that the 'Biden administration lost 20 million COVID vaccines...". According to PolitiFact, the Biden administration wasn't responsible for losing the vaccines and that the distribution infrastructure under which these vaccines went missing were set up during the Trump administration. PolitiFact rated Fournier's allegations on the missing vaccines as false.

On April 20, Fournier shared a Facebook post with an image reading "Derek Chauvin did not a get a fair trial". The statement was later retracted as an opinion. USA Today fact-checked Fournier's statement and considered it as missing context and ignoring the steps taken to ensure the trial was held in a due and fair manner.

On May 11, 2021, The Daily Beast reported that Fournier testified against long-time friend and co-founder of Students for Trump, John Lambert, in a case where the latter was accused of setting up a fictional New York law firm to pose as experienced attorneys and scam clients. Lambert was sentenced to 13 months in jail for multiple counts of wire fraud. Lambert's defense attorney has named Fournier as the co-conspirator in the case, suggesting that Lambert and Fournier used various gig sites to market themselves as licensed attorneys.

References

1995 births
activists from North Carolina
American Christians
American evangelicals
American podcasters
conservatism in the United States
living people
North Carolina Republicans
political activists